The Buddhavaṃsa (also known as the Chronicle of Buddhas) is a hagiographical Buddhist text which describes the life of Gautama Buddha and of the twenty-four Buddhas who preceded him and prophesied his attainment of Buddhahood. It is the fourteenth book of the Khuddaka Nikāya, which in turn is the fifth and last division of the Sutta Piṭaka. The Sutta Piṭaka is one of three pitakas (main sections) which together constitute the Tripiṭaka, or Pāli Canon of Theravāda Buddhism.

Along with the Apadāna and the Cariyāpiṭaka, the Buddhavaṃsa is considered by most scholars to have been written during the 1st and 2nd century BCE, and is therefore a late addition to the Pāli Canon.

Summary
The first chapter tells how Gautama Buddha, to demonstrate his supernormal knowledge, creates a jewelled walkway in the sky. In seeing this display, Sāriputta asks the Buddha:
"Of what kind, great hero, supreme among men, was your resolve? At what time, wise one, was supreme Awakening aspired to by you? ... Of what kind, wise one, leader of the world, were your ten perfections? How were the higher perfections fulfilled, how the ultimate perfections?"
In response, the Buddha relays the remainder of the Buddhavaṃsa.

In the second chapter Gautama tells how in a distant past life as layman named Sumedha, he received a prediction from Dīpankara Buddha that "In the next era you will become a buddha named Gotama.", and told him the ten perfections he would need to practice.

Chapters 3 through 26 are accounts of the twenty-four historical Buddhas who achieved Buddhahood between Dīpankara and Gautama, and the acts of merit that Gautama performed towards them in his previous lives.

Chapter 27 is an account of the life of Gautama Buddha.

Chapter 28 mentions three Buddhas that preceded Dīpankara, as well as the future Buddha, Maitreya.

Chapter 29 tells of the distribution of Gautama Buddha's relics after his death.

Translations

See also
 Cariyapitaka
 Jataka tales
 Pāramitā

Notes

References

External links
 The chronicle of twenty-four Buddhas, by Mingun Sayadaw, edited and translated by Professor U Ko Lay and U Tin Lwin, Yangon, Myanmar. Includes only chapters 1, 22, 23, and 24.

Khuddaka Nikaya
Buddhist hagiography